Stargate Project was a secret U.S. Army unit established in 1978 at Fort Meade, Maryland, by the Defense Intelligence Agency (DIA) and SRI International (a California contractor) to investigate the potential for psychic phenomena in military and domestic intelligence applications. The Project, and its precursors and sister projects, originally went by various code names'Gondola Wish', 'Stargate', 'Grill Flame', 'Center Lane', 'Project CF', 'Sun Streak', 'Scanate' until 1991 when they were consolidated and rechristened as "Stargate Project".

Stargate Project's work primarily involved remote viewing, the purported ability to psychically "see" events, sites, or information from a great distance. The project was overseen until 1987 by Lt. Frederick Holmes "Skip" Atwater, an aide and "psychic headhunter" to Maj. Gen. Albert Stubblebine, and later president of the Monroe Institute. The unit was small scale, comprising about 15 to 20 individuals, and was run out of "an old, leaky wooden barracks".

The Stargate Project was terminated and declassified in 1995 after a CIA report concluded that it was never useful in any intelligence operation. Information provided by the program was vague and included irrelevant and erroneous data, and there were suspicions of inter-judge reliability. The program was featured in the 2004 book and 2009 film, both titled The Men Who Stare at Goats, although neither mentions it by name.

Background
Information in the United States on psychic research in some foreign countries was poorly detailed, based mostly on rumor or innuendo from second-hand or tertiary reporting, attributed to both reliable and unreliable disinformation sources from the Soviet Union.

The CIA and DIA decided they should investigate and know as much about it as possible. Various programs were approved yearly and re-funded accordingly.  Reviews were made semi-annually at the Senate and House select committee level. Work results were reviewed, and remote viewing was attempted with the results being kept secret from the "viewer". It was thought that if the viewer was shown they were incorrect it would damage the viewer's confidence and skill. This was standard operating procedure throughout the years of military and domestic remote viewing programs. Feedback to the remote viewer of any kind was rare; it was kept classified and secret.

Remote viewing attempts to sense unknown information about places or events. Normally it is performed to detect current events, but during military and domestic intelligence applications viewers claimed to sense things in the future, experiencing precognition.

History

1970s

In 1970 United States intelligence sources believed that the Soviet Union was spending 60 million roubles annually on "psychotronic" research.  In response to claims that the Soviet program had produced results, the CIA initiated funding for a new program known as SCANATE ("scan by coordinate") in the same year.  Remote viewing research began in 1972 at the Stanford Research Institute (SRI) in Menlo Park, California.  Proponents (Russell Targ and Harold Puthoff) of the research said that a minimum accuracy rate of 65% required by the clients was often exceeded in the later experiments.

Physicists Russell Targ and Harold Puthoff began testing psychics for SRI in 1972, including one who would later become an international celebrity, Israeli Uri Geller. Their apparently successful results garnered interest within the U.S. Department of Defense. Ray Hyman, professor of psychology at the University of Oregon, was asked by Air Force psychologist Lt. Col. Austin W. Kibler (1930–2008)then Director of Behavioral Research for ARPAto go to SRI and investigate. He was to specifically evaluate Geller. Hyman's report to the government was that Geller was a "complete fraud" and as a consequence Targ and Puthoff lost their government contract to work further with him. The result was a publicity tour for Geller, Targ, and Puthoff to seek private funding for further research work on Geller.

One of the project's successes was the location of a lost Soviet spy plane in 1976 by Rosemary Smith, a young administrative assistant recruited by project director Dale Graff.

In 1977 the Army Assistant Chief of Staff for Intelligence (ACSI) Systems Exploitation Detachment (SED) started the Gondola Wish program to "evaluate potential adversary applications of remote viewing."  Army Intelligence then formalized this in mid-1978 as an operational program Grill Flame , based in buildings 2560 and 2561 at Fort Meade, in Maryland (INSCOM "Detachment G").

1980s
In early 1979 the research at SRI was integrated into 'Grill Flame', which was redesignated INSCOM 'Center Lane' Project (ICLP) in 1983. In 1984 the existence of the program was reported by Jack Anderson, and in that year it was unfavorably received by the National Academy of Sciences National Research Council.  In late 1985 the Army funding was terminated, but the program was redesignated 'Sun Streak' and funded by the DIA's Scientific and Technical Intelligence Directorate (office code DT-S).

1990s
In 1991 most of the contracting for the program was transferred from SRI to Science Applications International Corporation (SAIC), with Edwin May controlling 70% of the contractor funds and 85% of the data.  Its security was altered from Special Access Program (SAP) to Limited Dissemination (LIMDIS), and it was given its final name, STARGATE.

Closure (1995)
In 1995 the defense appropriations bill directed that the program be transferred from DIA to CIA oversight.  The CIA commissioned a report by the American Institutes for Research (AIR) that found that remote viewing had not been proved to work by a psychic mechanism, and said it had not been used operationally. The CIA subsequently cancelled and declassified the program.

In 1995 the project was transferred to the CIA and a retrospective evaluation of the results was done. The appointed panel consisted primarily of Jessica Utts and Ray Hyman. Hyman had produced an unflattering report on Uri Geller and SRI for the government two decades earlier, but the psychologist David Marks found Utts' appointment to the review panel "puzzling" given that she had published papers with Edwin May, considering this joint research likely to make her "less than [im]partial". A report by Utts claimed the results were evidence of psychic functioning; however, Hyman in his report argued Utts's conclusion that ESP had been proven to exist, especially precognition, was premature and the findings had not been independently replicated. Hyman came to the conclusion:

Psychologists, such as myself, who study subjective validation find nothing striking or surprising in the reported matching of reports against targets in the Stargate data. The overwhelming amount of data generated by the viewers is vague, general, and way off target. The few apparent hits are just what we would expect if nothing other than reasonable guessing and subjective validation are operating.

A later report by AIR came to a negative conclusion. Joe Nickell has written:

Other evaluators – two psychologists from AIR – assessed the potential intelligence-gathering usefulness of remote viewing. They concluded that the alleged psychic technique was of dubious value and lacked the concreteness and reliability necessary for it to be used as a basis for making decisions or taking action. The final report found "reason to suspect" that in "some well publicised cases of dramatic hits" the remote viewers might have had "substantially more background information" than might otherwise be apparent.

According to AIR, which performed a review of the project, no remote viewing report ever provided actionable information for any intelligence operation.

Based upon the collected findings, which recommended a higher level of critical research and tighter controls, the CIA terminated the 20 million dollar project, citing a lack of documented evidence that the program had any value to the intelligence community. Time magazine stated in 1995 three full-time psychics were still working on a $500,000-a-year budget out of Fort Meade, Maryland, which would soon close.

David Marks in his book The Psychology of the Psychic (2000) discussed the flaws in the Stargate Project in detail.  Marks wrote that there were six negative design features of the experiments. The possibility of cues or sensory leakage was not ruled out, no independent replication, some experiments were conducted in secret, making peer-review impossible. Marks noted that the judge Edwin May was also the principal investigator for the project and this was problematic, making a huge conflict of interest with collusion, cuing and fraud being possible. Marks concluded the project was nothing more than a "subjective delusion" and after two decades of research it had failed to provide any scientific evidence for the legitimacy of remote viewing.

The Stargate Project was terminated in 1995 following an independent review which concluded:

In January 2017, the CIA published records online of the Stargate Project  as part of the CREST archive.

Methodology
The Stargate Project created a set of protocols designed to make the research of clairvoyance and out-of-body experiences more scientific, and to minimize as much as possible session noise and inaccuracy. The term "remote viewing" emerged as shorthand to describe this more structured approach to clairvoyance. Project Stargate would only receive a mission after all other intelligence attempts, methods, or approaches had already been exhausted.

It was reported that at peak manpower there were over 22 active military and civilian remote viewers providing data. People leaving the project were not replaced. When the project closed in 1995 this number had dwindled down to three. One was using tarot cards. According to Joseph McMoneagle, "The Army never had a truly open attitude toward psychic functioning". Hence, the use of the term "giggle factor" and the saying, "I wouldn't want to be found dead next to a psychic."

Civilian personnel

Hal Puthoff
In the 1970s, CIA and DIA granted funds to Harold E. Puthoff to investigate paranormal abilities, collaborating with Russell Targ in a study of the purported psychic abilities of Uri Geller, Ingo Swann, Pat Price, Joseph McMoneagle and others, as part of the Stargate Project, of which Puthoff became a director.

As with Ingo Swann and Pat Price, Puthoff attributed much of his personal remote viewing skills to his involvement with Scientology whereby he had attained, at that time, the highest level. All three eventually left Scientology in the late 1970s.

Puthoff worked as the principal investigator of the project. His team of psychics is said to have identified spies, located Soviet weapons and technologies, such as a nuclear submarine in 1979 and helped find lost SCUD missiles in the first Gulf War and plutonium in North Korea in 1994.

Russell Targ

In the 1970s, Russell Targ began working with Harold Puthoff on Stargate Project, while working with him as a researcher at Stanford Research Institute.

Edwin May

Edwin C. May joined the Stargate Project in 1975 as a consultant and was working full-time in 1976. The original project was part of the Cognitive Sciences Laboratory managed by May. With more funding in 1991 May took the project to the Palo Alto offices at SAIC. This would last until 1995 when the CIA closed the project.

May worked as the principal investigator, judge and the star gatekeeper for the project. Marks says this was a serious weakness for the experiments as May had conflict of interest and could have done whatever he wanted with the data. Marks has written that May refused to release the names of the "oversight committee" and refused permission for him to give an independent judging of the star gate transcripts. Marks found this suspicious, commenting "this refusal suggests that something must be wrong with the data or with the methods of data selection."

Ingo Swann

Originally tested in the "Phase One" were OOBE-Beacon "RV" experiments at the American Society for Psychical Research, under research director Karlis Osis. A former OT VII Scientologist,
Swann's achievement was to break free from the conventional mold of casual experimentation and candidate burn out, and develop a viable set of protocols that put clairvoyance within a framework named "Coordinate Remote Viewing" (CRV).
In a 1995 letter Edwin C. May wrote he had not used Swann for two years because there were rumors of him briefing a high level person at SAIC and the CIA on remote viewing and aliens, ETs.

Pat Price
A former Burbank, California, police officer and former Scientologist who participated in a number of Cold War era remote viewing experiments, including the US government-sponsored projects SCANATE and the Stargate Project. Price joined the program after a chance encounter with fellow Scientologists (at the time) Harold Puthoff and Ingo Swann near SRI. Working with maps and photographs provided to him by the CIA, Price claimed to have been able to retrieve information from facilities behind Soviet lines. He is probably best known for his sketches of cranes and gantries which appeared to conform to CIA intelligence photographs. At the time, the CIA took his claims seriously.

Military personnel

Major General Albert Stubblebine

A key sponsor of the research internally at Fort Meade, Maryland, Maj. Gen. Stubblebine was convinced of the reality of a wide variety of psychic phenomena.  He required that all of his battalion commanders learn how to bend spoons a la Uri Geller, and he himself attempted several psychic feats, even attempting to walk through walls. In the early 1980s he was responsible for the United States Army Intelligence and Security Command (INSCOM), during which time the remote viewing project in the US Army began. Some commentators have confused a "Project Jedi", allegedly run by Special Forces primarily out of Fort Bragg, with Stargate. After some controversy involving these experiments, including alleged security violations from uncleared civilian psychics working in Sensitive Compartmented Information Facilities (SCIFs), Major General Stubblebine was placed on retirement.  His successor as the INSCOM commander was Major General Harry Soyster, who had a reputation as a much more conservative and conventional intelligence officer. MG Soyster was not amenable to continuing paranormal experiments and the Army's participation in Project Stargate ended during his tenure.

David Morehouse
In his book, Psychic Warrior: Inside the CIA's Stargate Program : The True Story of a Soldier's Espionage and Awakening (2000, St. Martin's Press), Morehouse claims to have worked on hundreds of Remote Viewing assignments, from searching for a Soviet jet that crashed in the jungle carrying an atomic bomb, to tracking suspected double agents.

Joseph McMoneagle

McMoneagle claims he had a remarkable memory of very early childhood events. He grew up surrounded by alcoholism, abuse and poverty. As a child, he had visions at night when scared, and began to hone his psychic abilities in his teens for his own protection when he hitchhiked. He enlisted to get away. McMoneagle became an experimental remote viewer while serving in U.S. Army Intelligence.

Ed Dames
Dames was one of the first five Army students trained by Ingo Swann through Stage 3 in coordinate remote viewing. Because Dames' role was intended to be as session monitor and analyst as an aid to Fred Atwater rather than a remote viewer, Dames received no further formal remote viewing training. After his assignment to the remote viewing unit at the end of January 1986, he was used to "run" remote viewers (as monitor) and provide training and practice sessions to viewer personnel.  He soon established a reputation for pushing CRV to extremes, with target sessions on Atlantis, Mars, UFOs, and aliens. He is a frequent guest on the Coast to Coast AM radio shows.

References

Further reading
 
 Caroll, Robert Todd (2012). "Remote Viewing". In the Skeptic's Dictionary. John Wiley & Sons. .
 Hines, Terence (2003). Pseudoscience and the Paranormal. Prometheus Books. .
 Hyman, Ray (1996). "Evaluation of the Military's Twenty-year Program on Psychic Spying". Skeptical Inquirer 20: 21–26.
 Morehouse, David (1996). Psychic Warrior, St. Martin's Paperbacks, . Morehouse was a psychic in the program.
 Ronson, Jon (2004). The Men Who Stare at Goats. Picador. . Written to accompany the TV series  Crazy Rulers of the World. The US military budget cuts after the Vietnam war and how it all began.
 
 Smith, Paul (2004). Reading the Enemy's Mind: Inside Star Gate: America's Psychic Espionage Program, Forge Books. 
 

1978 establishments in Maryland
American secret government programs
Central Intelligence Agency operations
Cold War tactics
Defense Intelligence Agency
Espionage projects
Human subject research in the United States
Pseudoscience
Remote viewing